The lawn bowls competition at the 1978 Commonwealth Games took place in Edmonton, Alberta, Canada from 3-12 August 1978.

Medal table

Medallists

Results 
 David Bryant defended his title with a fourth successive Commonwealth Games singles gold medal, the fifth of his medals cache despite not competing in 1966.Hong Kong win both the Pairs and Fours.

Men's singles – round robin

Men's pairs – round robin

Men's fours – round robin

+ Missing Hong Kong v N Ireland score

References

See also
List of Commonwealth Games medallists in lawn bowls
Lawn bowls at the Commonwealth Games

Lawn bowls at the Commonwealth Games
Brit